Frank A. O'Donnel (1852 New York City – July 5, 1906 Manhattan, New York City) was an American politician from New York.

Life
He attended the public schools and City College of New York. Then he became an accountant.

O'Donnel was a member of the New York State Assembly (New York Co., 12th D.) in 1893; and of the New York State Senate (10th D.) in 1894 and 1895.

He was a personal friend of Tammany Boss Charles Francis Murphy, and was Treasurer of the Society of St. Tammany from 1902 to 1904. Mayor George B. McClellan, Jr. appointed O'Donnel in January 1904 as President of the New York City Board of Taxes and Assessment.

In May 1906, he traveled to Europe trying to improve his health. However, he got rather worse, and soon returned. He died on July 5, 1906, in his apartments at the St. George, at 223 East 17th Street, in Manhattan; and was buried at the Woodlawn Cemetery in the Bronx.

References

External links

1852 births
1906 deaths
Democratic Party New York (state) state senators
Politicians from New York City
Democratic Party members of the New York State Assembly
Burials at Woodlawn Cemetery (Bronx, New York)
City College of New York alumni
19th-century American politicians